Katy Dunne (born 16 February 1995) is a British tennis player who is returning to competition after a long spell of injury.

Dunne has won eight singles titles and eight doubles titles on the ITF Circuit. On 28 May 2018, she reached her best singles ranking of world No. 212, and in July 2018 she peaked at No. 135 in the WTA doubles rankings.

In March 2016, Dunne won a major non-ITF title at Naremburn, Sydney. As the No. 2 seed, she defeated Shérazad Reix, 6–3, 6–2 to claim the $3,200 first prize at the prestigious North Shore Open.

She made her WTA Tour main-draw debut at the 2014 Birmingham Classic. Having defeated the tenth and second seeds in qualifying, Alizé Lim and Tímea Babos, respectively, she faced world No. 44, Camila Giorgi, in the first round, but had to retire with a hip injury after only three games of the third set.

Dunne was later handed a wildcard to compete in the Wimbledon qualifying for the third year running, but lost in the first round to the two-time quarterfinalist Tamira Paszek, in straight sets.
In 2018, she was handed a main-draw wildcard into Wimbledon where she played centre court against Jelena Ostapenko, pushing the seed to a tie break in the second set before losing in two sets.
In 2019, Dunne won a $60k tournament in Spain and picked up an injury shortly after that.

Her brother Conor Dunne was a professional cyclist and former Irish road race national champion.

ITF Circuit finals

Singles: 13 (8 titles, 5 runner–ups)

Doubles: 15 (8 titles, 7 runner–ups)

References

External links

 
 

1995 births
Living people
Sportspeople from Hemel Hempstead
British female tennis players
English female tennis players
Tennis people from Hertfordshire